Richonell Margaret (born 7 July 2000) is a Dutch professional footballer who plays as forward for Eerste Divisie club TOP Oss.

Career
Margaret played youth football for De Foresters and Ajax, and moved to Vitesse's academy in 2018, where he signed a contract until 2022. He made his professional debut for Vitesse on 18 January 2019, in a 3–2 home win over Excelsior, coming on for Oussama Darfalou in the 72nd minute. Margaret made a total of five appearances for the club.

On 13 July 2019, Margaret signed a three-year contract with AZ, initially joining the reserve team Jong AZ.

Ahead of the 2021–22 season, Margeret moved to TOP Oss on a one-season loan deal. He made his debut in 13 August in a 2–1 home win over VVV-Venlo, coming on as a late substitute for Jearl Margaritha.

On 4 September 2022, Margaret signed a permanent contract with TOP Oss, penning a two-year deal.

Personal life
Born in the Netherlands, Margaret is of Surinamese descent.

References

2000 births
Living people
People from Heerhugowaard
Footballers from North Holland
Dutch footballers
Dutch sportspeople of Surinamese descent
Association football forwards
Eredivisie players
Eerste Divisie players
SBV Vitesse players
Jong AZ players
TOP Oss players